This is a list of sovereign states in the 1990s, giving an overview of states around the world during the period between 1 January 1990 and 31 December 1999. It contains 241 entries, arranged alphabetically, with information on the status and recognition of their sovereignty. It includes 197 widely recognized sovereign states, 28 entities which claim an effective sovereignty but are considered de facto dependencies of other powers by the general international community, 2 associated states, 14 states which were initially unrecognized but then gained full recognition later in the decade, and 1 state which was initially widely recognized but then lost full recognition later in the decade.

Members or observers of the United Nations

Non-UN members or observers

Widely-recognized

Others

Other entities
Excluded from the list above are the following noteworthy entities which either were not fully sovereign or did not claim to be independent:
  as a whole had no government and no permanent population. Seven states claimed portions of Antarctica and five of these had reciprocally recognised one another's claims. These claims, which were regulated by the Antarctic Treaty System, were neither recognised nor disputed by any other signatory state.
  was occupied and administered by Indonesia until October 1999 as Timor Timur, but this was not recognized by the United Nations, which considered it to be Portuguese territory under Indonesian occupation. In October 1999, Indonesia relinquished control over the territory to the United Nations Transitional Administration in East Timor, which took over responsibility for it.
  was a part of the Soviet Union until August 1991, but its annexation was not widely recognized. A government in exile claimed independence for Estonia until 15 September 1992, but aside from its embassies in the West it controlled no territory.
  The European Union was a sui generis supranational organisation which had 12 (later 15) member states. It was established on 1 November 1993. The member states had transferred a measure of their legislative, executive, and judicial powers to the institutions of the EU, and as such the EU had some elements of sovereignty, without generally being considered a sovereign state. The European Union did not claim to be a sovereign state and had only limited capacity for relations with other states.
  Kosovo was a territory that was nominally part of Serbia and Montenegro, but after 10 June 1999 came under United Nations administration as part of the United Nations Interim Administration Mission in Kosovo.
  was a part of the Soviet Union until 1991, but its annexation was not widely recognized. A government in exile claimed independence for Latvia until 21 August 1991, but aside from its embassies in the West it controlled no territory.
  was a part of the Soviet Union until 1990, but its annexation was not widely recognized. Stasys Lozoraitis Jr. claimed independence for Lithuania until 6 September 1991, but aside from its embassies in the West it controlled no territory.
  The Sovereign Military Order of Malta was an entity claiming sovereignty and (from 24 August 1994) a United Nations observer. The order had bi-lateral diplomatic relations with a large number of states, but had no territory other than extraterritorial areas within Rome. The order's Constitution stated: "The Order is a subject of international law and exercises sovereign functions." Although the order frequently asserted its sovereignty, it did not claim to be a sovereign state. It lacked a defined territory. Since all its members were citizens of other states, almost all of them lived in their native countries, and those who resided in the order's extraterritorial properties in Rome did so only in connection with their official duties, the order lacked the characteristic of having a permanent population.
  The United Nations Transitional Administration in East Timor was a transitional non-independent territory governed by the United Nations. It was neither sovereign nor under the sovereignty of any other state. It was established on 25 October 1999, following the end of the Indonesian occupation of East Timor.
  West Berlin was a political enclave that was closely aligned with – but not actually a part of – West Germany. It consisted of three occupied sectors administered by the United States, the United Kingdom, and France. West Berlin was incorporated into the reunified Germany on 3 October 1990.

See also
List of sovereign states by year
1990s
List of state leaders in 1990
List of state leaders in 1991
List of state leaders in 1992
List of state leaders in 1993
List of state leaders in 1994
List of state leaders in 1995
List of state leaders in 1996
List of state leaders in 1997
List of state leaders in 1998
List of state leaders in 1999

Notes

References

1990-1999
1990s politics-related lists